Róbert Tomko (born 16 December 1979 in Prešov) is a Slovak football striker who currently plays for TJ ISKRA Borčice.

References

External links
 at fcvion.sk 

1979 births
Living people
Slovak footballers
Association football forwards
MFK Ružomberok players
1. FC Tatran Prešov players
FC ViOn Zlaté Moravce players
Partizán Bardejov players
Slovak Super Liga players
Sportspeople from Prešov